The Calumet County Courthouse, built in 1913, is an historic copper-domed county courthouse building located at 206 Court St in Chilton, Wisconsin. Designed by B. Mehner in the Classical Revival style, it was built of red brick.

In 1978, it was added to the National Register of Historic Places.

It is a three-story building with a low center dome.  It has a concrete-block ground story and two red brick stories.  Inside, it had a three-story rotunda but that was reduced in the 1960s.  It was designed by architect Baldwin Mehner of Dorchester, Wisconsin, who soon after designed the Taylor County Courthouse (1913, which was NRHP-listed in 1980). The two courthouses have only minor differences.

References

Courthouses on the National Register of Historic Places in Wisconsin
Neoclassical architecture in Wisconsin
Government buildings completed in 1913
Buildings and structures in Calumet County, Wisconsin
County courthouses in Wisconsin
1913 establishments in Wisconsin
National Register of Historic Places in Calumet County, Wisconsin